North-Western Tunnel is a road and subway tunnel in Moscow, Russia. It is a part of the Krasnopresnensky prospekt, that extends the  M9 motorway to the city center, and of the Arbatsko-Pokrovskaya Metro Line.

It runs under the Serebryany bor forest. The double-level tunnel combines the road and railway traffic.

The tunnel was opened on December 27, 2007.

See also
 Zhivopisny Bridge (another part of the Krasnopresnensky prospekt)

Streets in Moscow
Road tunnels in Russia
Tunnels completed in 2007